Senator Ford may refer to:

Aaron D. Ford (born 1972), Nevada state senator (2013-2018)
Edward Hastings Ford, as the fictional character Senator Ford on Can You Top This?
Henry Ford (Michigan legislator) (1825–1894), Michigan State Senate
J. D. Ford (born 1982), Indiana State Senate
Joel D. M. Ford (born 1969), North Carolina Senate
John Salmon Ford (1815–1897), Texas State Senate
John Ford (New York state senator) (1862–1941), New York State Senate
John Ford (Tennessee politician) (born 1942), Tennessee State Senate
Jon Ford (American politician) (born 1972), Indiana State Senate
Ophelia Ford (born 1950), Tennessee State Senate
Robert Ford (politician) (born 1948), South Carolina State Senate
Seabury Ford (1801–1855), Ohio State Senate
Wendell Ford (1924–2015), Kentucky State Senator and U.S. Senator from Kentucky from 1974 to 1999
William D. Ford (1927–2004), Michigan State Senate

See also
Captain Ford
Mayor Ford
President Gerald Ford (1913–2006)
General Ford
Judge Ford (disambiguation)
Justice Ford (disambiguation)
Governor Ford (disambiguation)